The Cape Dory 25, also called the Cape Dory 25 Mark I, is an American trailerable sailboat that was designed by George H. Stadel Jr. as a cruiser and first built in 1973.

The Cape Dory 25 is sometimes confused with the unrelated 1981 design from the same manufacturer which replaced it in production, the Cape Dory 25D.

Production
The design was built by Cape Dory Yachts in East Taunton, Massachusetts, United States. A total of 845 boats were built between 1973 and 1982, but it is now out of production.

Design
The Cape Dory 25 is a development of the Allied Boat Company's Greenwich 24, using the same hull, but a new deck and coach house. Allied sold the molds to Cape Dory in 1972. Cape Dory increased the freeboard to improve below decks headroom and this also added  to both the length overall and the waterline length. They also redesigned the interior.

The Cape Dory 25 is a recreational keelboat, built predominantly of fiberglass, with wood trim. It has a masthead sloop rig with a deck-stepped mast; a spooned, raked stem, a raised counter, angled transom; a keel-mounted rudder controlled by a tiller and a fixed long keel. It displaces  and carries  of ballast.

The boat is normally fitted with a small  outboard motor for docking and maneuvering.

The design has sleeping accommodation for four people, with a double "V"-berth in the bow cabin and two straight settees in the main cabin. The main cabin also has  drop leaf table. The galley is located on the starboard side just forward of the companionway ladder. The galley is equipped with a two-burner stove and a sink. The head is located just aft of the bow cabin on the port side. There is a lazarette in the stern for stowage.

Operational history
The boat is supported by an active class club that organizes racing events, the Cape Dory Sailboat Owners Association.

In a 2000 review in Practical Sailor,  Darrell Nicholson wrote, "the Cape Dory 25 is really a daysailing and weekending boat. Although the boat has berths for 4, accommodations are cramped and creature comforts minimal."

In a 2010 review Steve Henkel wrote of the design, "best features: These changes [from the Greenwich 24] got rid of some of the "Worst features" [of] the Greenwich 24 ... and if the manufacturer's specifications are to be believed, after all these additions were made, the boat's weight increased by a mere 25 pounds, with no change in ballast. Can you believe it? We don’t. Worst features: Headroom is still too low, but this fault is corrected in the next incarnation, namely the [Cape Dory 25D]."

A Blue Water Boats review noted, "the Cape Dory 25 was Cape Dory's first foray into fully fledged cruisers. The story goes that founder Andy Vavolotis got a hold of the molds for the Greenwich 24 from Allied Boat Company in 1972 and raised her freeboard to improve headroom, thereby adding seven inches to her length. Other alterations included a fully enclosed head, a hanging locker, and an enlarged galley. She's a sloop rigged full keeler with a narrow low-freeboard hull that invites a wet ride. The design is quite dated but traditionalist[s] will love the classic lines and underwater profile, and of course true to Cape Dory tradition, the construction is bulletproof."

See also
List of sailing boat types

Related development
Greenwich 24

References

External links

Keelboats
1970s sailboat type designs
Sailing yachts
Trailer sailers
Sailboat type designs by George H. Stadel Jr.
Sailboat types built by Cape Dory Yachts